Bonin English, or the Bonin Islands language, is an English-based creole of the Ogasawara Islands (informally called Bonin Islands) south of Japan with strong Japanese influence, to the extent that it has been called a mixture of English and Japanese.

History
The Colony of Peel Island was the first permanent settlement in the archipelago. Peel Island (aka Chichijima) was settled in the early nineteenth century by speakers of eighteen European and Austronesian languages, including American English and Hawaiian. This resulted in a pidgin English that became a symbol of island identity. It creolized among second- and third-generation speakers as thousands of Japanese speakers settled the islands. The islanders became bilingual, and during the early twentieth century Bonin English incorporated elements of Japanese. Throughout the 20th century, most islanders used Bonin English at home. During the US occupation of 1946–68, the so-called "Navy Generation" learned American English at school, for example developing an – distinction and a rhotic  that their parents did not have. While Bonin English vocabulary skewed toward English during this period, a trend towards Japanese resumed after the occupation ended. Today, younger residents tend to be monolingual in a variety of Japanese closely resembling the Tokyo standard, with some learning standard English due to globalization. A bilingual spoken dictionary was published in 2005.

References

English-based pidgins and creoles
Languages of Japan
Mixed languages
Japanese-based pidgins and creoles
Bonin Islands